Turn Back may refer to:

Music 
 Turn Back (album), a 1981 album by Toto, or the title track
 Turn Back (EP), a 2004 EP by The Pillows
 "Turn Back" (K Koke song), 2012

Other 
 A turn-back facility, in railroading
 Torna atrás (English: "turn-back"), a mixed-race individual who appears to be only one race